John Pollexfen Bastard (18 September 1756 – 4 April 1816) was a British Tory politician, landowner and colonel of the East Devon Militia who was born and lived at Kitley House, Yealmpton, Devon.

He married Sarah Wymondesold of East Lockinge, Berkshire, on 25 March 1780 at St Mary, Lambeth. She died in April 1808 leaving no surviving children. On 2 July 1809 he married, at Portland Chapel, Marylebone, Judith Anne Martin, daughter of Sir Henry Martin, naval commissioner at Portsmouth and Comptroller of the Navy. He left no children of either marriage.

Defence of Plymouth

When colonel of the East Devon Militia his father, William Bastard, saved the arsenal of Plymouth from the French Fleet in August 1779 and, to recognise that, was gazetted a baronet on 4 September but he declined to assume the title. Through his mother, born Bridget Poulett, William was a member of the Poulett, Bertie, Herbert and other influential families.

In 1801 when colonel of the same regiment John Pollexfen Bastard quelled a riot of workmen and prevented the destruction of the Plymouth docks and dockyards. In 1815 he was conveyed by the Royal Navy to Leghorn (Livorno) for his health where he died the next year and was initially buried in the Old English Cemetery in Livorno, where his monument still stands. His body was returned to Devon in a man-of-war.

Parliament
He was elected Member of Parliament for Truro in 1783 and for the Devonshire Constituency from 1784. He stood down in 1812 and was succeeded by his nephew Edmund Pollexfen Bastard (1784-1838) (the eldest son of his younger brother Edmund Bastard (1758–1816)), who held the seat until 1830.

According to the Oxford Companion to Children's Literature, Bastard
indirectly inspired the familiar form of the children's rhyme "Old Mother Hubbard..."
after instructing its author Sarah Catherine Martin, his sister-in-law, to "run away and write one of your stupid little rhymes."

Bastard owned several houses and large tracts of land in western England including his main residence Kitley House.

The National Portrait Gallery has a portrait of John Pollexfen Bastard standing beside his younger brother Edmund in a mezzotint of a painting by James Northcote.

He also can be spotted in Karl Anton Hickel's William Pitt addressing the House of Commons on the French Declaration of War, 1793 in the collection of the National Portrait Gallery.

A detailed account of his last journey and subsequent death can be found in the letters of Miss Eliza Simcoe, daughter of John Graves Simcoe, who travelled with John Pollexfen Bastard and his wife to Leghorn as part of her Grand Tour. She accompanied his wife on the rest of the journey and nursed her through several episodes of bad health. The letters are held at Devon Record Office as part of the Simcoe Family papers (REF:1038M).

Disambiguation
John Pollexfen Bastard—Johnn Bastard RN and Edmund Pollexfen Bastard—Edmund Bastard

References

Alastair W. Massie, ‘Bastard, John Pollexfen (1756–1816)’, Oxford Dictionary of National Biography, Oxford University Press, 2004; online edn, Jan 2009
 John Burke, ‘Bastard of Kitley’, A Genealogical and Heraldic History of the Commoners of Great Britain and Ireland. London: Henry Colburn, 1834

External links
John Pollexfen Bastard's memorial at Livorno
Devon Record Office mainpage
 

1756 births
1816 deaths
Tory MPs (pre-1834)
Members of the Parliament of Great Britain for Devon
British MPs 1784–1790
British MPs 1790–1796
British MPs 1796–1800
Members of the Parliament of the United Kingdom for Devon
UK MPs 1801–1802
UK MPs 1802–1806
UK MPs 1806–1807
UK MPs 1807–1812
UK MPs 1812–1818
Members of the Parliament of Great Britain for Truro
Devon Militia officers
British Militia officers